The Citra Award for Best Supporting Actress is an award given at the Indonesian Film Festival (FFI) to Indonesian actresses for their achievements in a supporting role. The Citra Awards, described by Screen International as "Indonesia's equivalent to the Oscars", are the country's most prestigious film awards and are intended to recognize achievements in films as well as to draw public interest to the film industry.

Christine Hakim is the most recent winner for her performance in Impetigore at the 2020 ceremony, her third win in the category and ninth Citra Awards overall.

History 
The Citra Awards, then known as the Indonesian Film Festival Awards, were first given in 1955 to Endang Kusdiningsih (Tarmina). Succeeding festivals were held in 1960 and 1967 and annually since 1973. There were no Citra Awards given between 1993 and 2003 due to sharp decline in domestic film production. It was reinstated as an annual event in 2004 after receiving funds from the Indonesian government.

Christine Hakim is the most successful actress in this category with three wins out of four nominations. Combined with her record in the Best Actress category, Hakim is Indonesia's most decorated actress with nine overall Citra Awards out of fourteen nominations. Nani Widjaja is the next most successful actress in the category with two wins out of five nominations. Rima Melati holds the distinction for having the most nominations without any wins with five, most recently in 1989 for Arini II.

Two actresses have received multiple nominations in the same year: Shanty for Dead Time: Kala and Maaf, Saya Menghamili Istri Anda in 2007 (lost to Meriam Bellina) as well as Jajang C. Noer for 3 Nafas Likas and Cahaya Dari Timur: Beta Maluku in 2014 (lost to Tika Bravani).

The award was not presented at the 1974 ceremony. In 1984, no winner was selected although three actresses were nominated.

Nominations and awards

1950s–1970s

1980s

1990s

2000s

2010s

2020s

Multiple wins and nominations

Explanatory notes

See also 

 Cinema of Indonesia
 Indonesian Film Festival
 Citra Award for Best Picture
 Citra Award for Best Director
 Citra Award for Best Actor
 Citra Award for Best Actress
 Citra Award for Best Supporting Actor
 Maya Awards

References



Citra Awards
Film awards for supporting actress